\

Solomon Township is a township in Graham County, Kansas, United States.  As of the 2000 census, its population was 209.

Geography
According to the USGS, it contains one cemetery, Marland.

The streams of County Line Creek and Southeast Fork County Line Creek run through this township.

References
 USGS Geographic Names Information System (GNIS)

External links
 US-Counties.com
 City-Data.com

Townships in Graham County, Kansas
Townships in Kansas